The Serbian Orthodox Eparchy of Britain and Scandinavia or Serbian Orthodox Diocese of Britain and Scandinavia is a Serbian Orthodox Church diocese in Western Europe. Its headquarters are in Enskede gård, Stockholm, Sweden. It operates churches in Denmark, Finland, Iceland, Norway, Sweden, and the United Kingdom. Missionary parishes in the Republic of Ireland and Malta have priests from England.

See also

 Eastern Orthodoxy in Norway
 Eastern Orthodoxy in Sweden
 Eastern Orthodoxy in the Republic of Ireland
 Serbs in the United Kingdom
 Serbs in Norway
 Serbs in Sweden

References

External links
 Serbian Orthodox Diocese of Britain and Scandinavia
 Diocese of Britain and Scandinavia (old pages)  (Archive)
 Diocese of Britain and Scandinavia: Kontakti (old pages) 
 St. Sava Church in London 
 Session of the Diocesan Council of the Diocese of Britain-Scandinavia
 Serbian Orthodox church of Saint Sava consecrated in Stockholm
 Thomas Arentzen: Ortodoxa och österländska kyrkor i Sverige, SST:s skriftserie (Swedish): 88–92.

Gallery

Religious sees of the Serbian Orthodox Church
Religious organizations based in Sweden
Serbian Orthodox Church in the United Kingdom
Serbian Orthodox Church in Denmark
Serbian Orthodox Church in Norway
Serbian Orthodox Church in Sweden
Serbian Orthodox Church in Finland
Serbian Orthodox Church in Iceland
Serbian Orthodox Church in the Republic of Ireland
Eastern Orthodox dioceses in the United Kingdom
Eastern Orthodox dioceses in Ireland
Dioceses in Denmark